Lee Dong-gyeong (born 20 September 1997) is a South Korean professional footballer who plays as a midfielder for Hansa Rostock, on loan from Ulsan Hyundai, and the South Korea national team.

Club career
On 31 January 2022, Lee joined Schalke 04 in Germany on loan until the end of the season, with an option to buy. On 10 June 2022, the loan was extended until the end of 2022. This contract was released on 1 September 2022 and he was immediately loaned to Hansa Rostock for one season.

Career statistics

Club

International

Scores and results list South Korea's goal tally first, score column indicates score after each Lee goal.

Honours
Ulsan Hyundai
AFC Champions League: 2020
Schalke 04
2. Bundesliga: 2021-22

South Korea U23
AFC U-23 Championship: 2020

References

External links
 Lee Dong-gyeong – Stats at KFA 
 

1997 births
Living people
Sportspeople from Daegu
South Korean footballers
Association football midfielders
South Korea international footballers
South Korea under-23 international footballers
Ulsan Hyundai FC players
FC Anyang players
FC Schalke 04 players
FC Hansa Rostock players
K League 1 players
K League 2 players
2. Bundesliga players
Footballers at the 2020 Summer Olympics
Olympic footballers of South Korea
South Korean expatriate footballers
Expatriate footballers in Germany
South Korean expatriate sportspeople in Germany